Dorian Diring (born 11 April 1992) is a French professional footballer who plays as a midfielder. He is currently without a club.

References

External links 
 

1992 births
Living people
French footballers
Association football midfielders
Footballers from Mulhouse
FC Mulhouse players
Hertha BSC II players
FC Erzgebirge Aue players
Hallescher FC players
SV Waldhof Mannheim players
2. Bundesliga players
3. Liga players
French expatriate sportspeople in Germany
French expatriate footballers
Expatriate footballers in Germany